25 Cabot Square is a 17-floor office building occupied by Morgan Stanley in the Canary Wharf development in London, England.

The architect on the project was Skidmore, Owings & Merrill, and the building was completed in 1991. It is 81 metres tall with a floorspace of 41,666.00 m2.

For several years, 25 Cabot Square was connected at the first floor level to neighbouring 20 Cabot Square by an enclosed pedestrian footbridge, built after both properties were completed.  This pedestrian link was removed in early 2010 when Morgan Stanley moved out of 20 Cabot Square.

In June 2017, construction started on a major refurbishment of the building with a phased completion from December 2018.

See also
Canary Wharf
Morgan Stanley

References

External links
From skyscrapernews.com
Black and white photograph by Sheena Woodhead
https://www.hines.com/news/hines-to-commence-redevelopment-of-25-cabot-square

1991 establishments in England
Skyscraper office buildings in London
Buildings and structures in the London Borough of Tower Hamlets
Canary Wharf buildings
Skidmore, Owings & Merrill buildings
Office buildings completed in 1991